West Bengal State Electricity Distribution Company Limited (WBSEDCL) is a wholly owned enterprise of Government of West Bengal, established in 2007 as one of the two successors of West Bengal State Electricity Board, and is responsible for providing power to 96% of West Bengal with a customer base of more than 1.68 crore across the state.

It states its Vision 'To Be The Best Power Utility In India In Terms Of Customer Service, Efficiency And Financial Viability' while its Mission to "Supply Uninterrupted and Quality Power to All.

It is expanding the range and quantity of uninterrupted electric supply in the remote villages in rapid speed.

History
The Government of West Bengal unbundled the erstwhile West Bengal State Electricity Board (WBSEB) into two companies viz., West Bengal State Electricity Distribution Company Limited (WBSEDCL) and West Bengal State Electricity Transmission Company Limited (WBSETCL). The main business of WBSEDCL is distribution and hydro generation of electricity. It is also the Nodal Agency of the Government of West Bengal for undertaking the Rural Electrification task in the State with the objective of providing access to electricity to all rural households in the state in line with the National Rural Electrification Policy. After the successful implementation of the Purulia Pumped Storage Project in the 10th Plan period with a capacity of 900 MW hydel power, the company has taken up the ambitious plan of implementing the Turga Pumped Storage Project in the 13th Plan period with an installed capacity of 4 x 250 MW.

Board of Directors

The company is managed by a Board of Directors comprising twelve members out of which seven are executive directors including Chairman & Managing Director. Besides one Woman Director and four Independent Directors constitute the Board.[5] includes

List Of Directors Name

Shri Santanu Basu, IAS

Chairman & M.D. and Director (Finance)

Shri Ajay Kumar Pandey

Director (Regulatory & Trading)

Shri Avijit Kumar Latua, WBCS(Exec.)

Director (Human Resources) & Executive Director(IT) 

Shri Gautam Sengupta

Director(Projects)

Shri Partha Pratim Mukherjee

Director(Distribution)

Mr. Subhasankar Debsarma Biswas

Director (Generation)
 
Smt. Saswati Banerjee, IAS(Retd.)

Independent and Women Director

Shri Pankaj Batra

Independent Director

Shri Srikumar Bandyopadhyay

Independent Director

Ms. Goma Lhamu Tshering, WBCS (Exec.)

Government Nominee Director

Mr. Saurabh Majumdar, WBA & AS

Government Nominee Director

Operations
WBSEDCL provides power to a customer base of more than 2.03 crores across West Bengal through its service network spanning  5 Zones, 20 Regional Offices, 76 Distribution Divisions, and 534 Customer Care Centers.

In the field of Information Technology, WBSEDCL has implemented Enterprise Resource Planning – SAP in Financial Accounting & Control, Material Management, HR with Payroll, Plant Maintenance and Project System. Apart from that SCADA, Smart Grid, development of IT system through R-APDRP Project, Mobile App development, e-payment through own website and third party,Spot bill, collection kiosk etc. have been implemented.

After successful implementation of Purulia Pumped Stotage Project in 10th Plan period with a capacity of 900 MW hydel power, the company has taken up the ambitious plan of implementing Turga Pumped Storage Project in the 13th Plan period with installed capacity of 4 x 250 MW.

A Project titled Integrated Power Development Scheme (IPDS)for strengthening of sub-transmission and Distribution networks, metering of Distribution transformers, reduction of AT&C loss, access to power to all houseland etc. in the urban areas having population of more than 50,000 as per 2011 census has been undertaken. Many new Sub-Stations have been constructed under this centrally funded scheme across the state of West Bengal.

A Project titled DEENDAYAL UPADHYAYA GRAM JYOTI YOJANA (DDUGJY) for separation of agricultural and non-agricultural feeders, strengthening of sub-transmission and Distribution networks, metering of Distribution transformers, reduction of AT&C loss, access to power to all houseland etc. in the rural areas has been undertaken. Many new Sub-Stations have been constructed under this centrally funded scheme across the state of West Bengal.

A new project to be funded by the World Bank is also in the pipeline.

A programme for system improvement under Sech Bandhu Scheme has also been conceived for rural areas.

See also
CESC

References

State agencies of West Bengal
Electric power transmission system operators in India
Energy in West Bengal
State electricity agencies of India
Companies based in Kolkata
2007 establishments in West Bengal
Indian companies established in 2000